Oxytelini is a tribe of spiny-legged rove beetles in the family Staphylinidae. There are about 11 genera and at least 20 described species in Oxytelini.

Genera
These 11 genera belong to the tribe Oxytelini:
 Anotylus Thomson, 1859 i c g b
 Aploderus Stephens, 1833 i c g b
 Apocellus Erichson, 1839 i c g b
 Carpelimus Leach, 1819 i c g b
 Manda Blackwelder, 1952 i c g b
 Neoxus Herman, 1970 i c g b
 Ochthephilus Mulsant & Rey, 1856 i c g b
 Oxytelus Gravenhorst, 1802 i c g b
 Platystethus Mannerheim, 1830 i c g b
 Thinobius Kiesenwetter, 1844 i c g b
 Thinodromus Kraatz, 1857 i c g b
Data sources: i = ITIS, c = Catalogue of Life, g = GBIF, b = Bugguide.net

References

Further reading

External links

 

Oxytelinae
Beetle tribes